The 2013 United States motorcycle Grand Prix was the ninth round of the 2013 Grand Prix motorcycle racing season, and the second of three races in the 2013 season to take place in the United States of America. It was held on 21 July at the Laguna Seca Raceway in Monterey, California. Like always, only a MotoGP class race was held at Laguna Seca.

Stefan Bradl took pole position, recording his first pole position in MotoGP. At the famous corkscrew turn on lap 4 Marc Márquez, having had a faster run out of the previous corner, ran around the outside of Valentino Rossi coming into the corkscrew and was run wide by Rossi mid-corner. Márquez replicated the overtake that Rossi made on Casey Stoner at the same corner in 2008 to pass the Italian and gave chase to Bradl. The gap closed quickly at first but Márquez followed Bradl until lap 19 when he made a pass into the last corner, with the gap gradually extending in Márquez' favour over the next few laps, the Spaniard eventually winning his 3rd GP of the year to extend his championship lead to 16 points over Dani Pedrosa. The win also marked the beating of another of Freddie Spencer's records as Márquez became the youngest rider to win back to back races in the Premier Class of GP racing and the first/only rookie to win at Mazda Raceway Laguna Seca. This was the last MotoGP race to take place at Laguna Seca, which was then replaced by the Autódromo Termas de Río Hondo in 2014 in Termas de Río Hondo, Argentina. Bradl finished in second place, recorded his first podium in MotoGP and Rossi finished in third place.

Classification

MotoGP

Championship standings after the race (MotoGP)
Below are the standings for the top five riders and constructors after round nine has concluded.

Riders' Championship standings

Constructors' Championship standings

 Note: Only the top five positions are included for both sets of standings.

References

United States motorcycle Grand Prix
United States
United States Motorcycle Grand Prix
United States Motorcycle Grand Prix
United States motorcycle Grand Prix